The following is a list of current affiliates of Movies!, a classic films network. This list consists of confirmed Movies! affiliates, arranged by U.S. state. Movies! is currently carried on over-the-air TV stations in the United States, most of whom carry the network on a digital subchannel. The network is also available on the streaming service Frndly TV.

Current affiliates

† Any launch dates noted are subject to change.

Former affiliates

References

External links
 Where to Watch Movies! TV Network
 RabbitEars Website

Movies!